2022 Pakistan Super League (also known as PSL 7 or, for sponsorship reasons, HBL PSL 2022) was the seventh season of the Pakistan Super League, a franchise Twenty20 cricket league which was established by the Pakistan Cricket Board (PCB) in 2015. Played between six teams in a double round robin format with strict COVID-19 protocols, the league began on 27 January 2022 with the first phase taking place in Karachi. The second phase including the playoffs took place in Lahore, with the Final played on 27 February where Lahore Qalandars beat Multan Sultans by 42 runs to win their maiden PSL title.

HBL Pakistan retained the title sponsorship, and the broadcast partners are PTV Sports and A Sports, while Daraz is the livestreaming partner.

Squads 

The players' draft took place on 12 December 2021, while a replacement draft took place on 8 January 2022.

Shahid Afridi had stated PSL 2022 would be his farewell season but on 13 February, he withdrew mid-season due to injury. On February 19, James Faulkner was banned by the PCB due to inappropriate behavior and Faulkner resigned from the league.

Venues 
On 24 July 2021, PCB announced that the seventh season of PSL will be held in January and February 2022 with all matches taking place in Pakistan. The National Stadium, Karachi, would host 15 matches, while the Gaddafi Stadium, Lahore, would host 19 matches including the playoffs.

On 30 December 2021, National Command and Operation Center issued that only fully vaccinated people will be allowed to gather at the stadiums, after potentially lifting the restrictions of COVID-19 pandemic in Pakistan. Tickets sale started from 11 January 2022.

On 19 January 2022, NCOC banned the entry for kids under age of 12 as they were not eligible for vaccination yet, and issued that only 25 percent crowd will be allowed in the Karachi phase. On 7 February, it was issued that 50 percent crowd will be allowed in the Lahore phase initially, and then full crowd including children will be allowed from 16 February.

COVID-19 protocols 
On 5 January, it was reported that all matches will be played as per schedule under strict standard operating procedures, though the officials were worried about a surge in SARS-CoV-2 Omicron variant, as they neither wanted to shift the league to UAE, nor wanted to postpone due to a packed international schedule of Pakistan cricket team.

Therefore, a pool of about 19 local players was reserved in isolation; these could be used in replacement in case of any emergency, like if more than 8 players out of 22 from any team test COVID-19 positive. If the whole league got struck then the winner would have been announced on playing conditions instead.

The PCB regulated three distinct bubbles with different protocols. The main bubble had all the teams, staff, and officials. Each franchise was not allowed to meet within the hotel premises. The two other bubbles were set at separate hotel, comprising production crew and ground staff respectively. The bubbles were also not allowed to interact, and every individual should follow health and safety guidelines. Any violation might result in fines or expulsion from the league.

On 2 February, PCB suspended umpire Faisal Afridi from next five matches due to breaching the bubble, and he had been fined 50% of his fees from next match.

Match officials 
On 17 January, PCB announced the list of officials for league stage matches; this includes 3 Elite Panel of ICC Umpires out of 12, and 2 Elite Panel of ICC Referees out of 5, while others are from PCB's Elite Panels.

Umpires 

  Faisal Afridi
  Aleem Dar
  Michael Gough
  Nasir Hussain
  Richard Illingworth
  Imtiaz Iqbal
  Imran Javed
  Ahsan Raza
  Shozab Raza
  Rashid Riaz
  Asif Yaqoob
  Waleed Yaqub

Referees 

  Iftikhar Ahmed
  Muhammad Javed
  Ranjan Madugalle
  Roshan Mahanama
  Ali Naqvi

Marketing 
The season's logo variant was unveiled on 6 January with the hashtag #HBLPSL7 also being used on social media.

Broadcast rights 
Since the previous deals concluded in 2021 after a three-year run, HBL renewed the title sponsorship rights for four more years with a 55% increase from the previous deal. PCB signed a new two-year broadcast deal on 10 January 2022 with a consortium of Pakistan Television Corporation (PTV) and ARY Digital Network; their bid was 50% more than the previous deal. Daraz signed for the livestreaming rights on 22 January; they won the bid on 26 December with a 175% increase.

In response to the broadcast rights, Aitzaz Ahsan told that Lahore High Court dismissed the petitions filed by Geo TV; one against PCB's bidding process and the other against PTV-ARY joint venture. Ten Sports also broadcast this season after a gap of three years.

Anthem and curtain raiser 

PCB announced two-year partnership with TikTok on 21 January. The anthem titled "Agay Dekh", sung by Atif Aslam and Aima Baig, was released on 24 January. This season featured a low-scale curtain raiser in Karachi on 27 January.

Media personnels 

PCB revealed the names of media personnels on 22 January, they presented in both English and Urdu.

Curtain closer 
The curtain closer took place on 27 February, where trophy was revealed by Red Bull drift driver Abdo Feghali, and Hadiya Hashmi performed Qaumi Taranah.

League stage

Format 
Each team will play every other team twice in the league stage of the tournament in a double round robin. Following the group stage, the top four teams will qualify for the playoff stage of the tournament.

Points table

Summary

League progression

Fixtures 
The PCB confirmed the fixtures for the tournament on 3 December 2021.

Karachi

Lahore

Summary

Week 1 
The defending champions Multan Sultans got off to a winning start in game one, beating Karachi by 7 wickets. Peshawar also got off to a winning start in game two, as Hussain Talat's 52 help them beat Quetta by 5 wickets. Khushdil Shah hit four boundaries in the final over of game three as the Sultans beat the Qalandars by 5 wickets. On the same day, Naseem Shah took 5 wickets to help Quetta to an 8 wicket win over Karachi. The next day Islamabad started their tournament with a 9 wicket win over Peshawar. This was largely down to Alex Hales, who scored an unbeaten 82 in the victory. Fakhar Zaman scored the first century of the season in game six, helping the Lahore Qalandars to a 6 wicket win over Karachi. In game seven, Multan were looking to continue their winning start against Quetta. They did this with a half century from Shan Masood propelling them to a 6 run win. Shadab Khan's 91 was in vain in game eight, as Multan beat Islamabad by 20 runs. In game nine, Fakhar Zaman scored 66 to help Lahore to a 29 run win over Peshawar.

Week 2 
Shadab Khan led from the front in game ten, he took 5 wickets as Islamabad beat Quetta by 43 runs. Shoaib Malik gave Peshawar their second win of the season in game eleven. He scored 52 as Peshawar defeated Quetta by 9 runs. The next day, Zaman Khan bowled an economical last over, conceding four as Lahore beat Islamabad by 8 runs. On the same day, Tim David scored the second fastest half century in PSL history, as Multan beat Peshawar by 57 runs. Match 14 saw another loss for the Karachi Kings, this time by 42 runs to Islamabad United. In the last game of the Karachi leg, Jason Roy scored the highest score of the tournament. He scored 116 as Quetta chased down 204 to beat Lahore by 7 wickets.

Week 3 
The Lahore leg started with another win for the Multan Sultans, this time by 42 runs over Peshawar, which later meant they qualified for the play-offs. Multan's unbeaten run came to an end the next day, as Lahore led by Fakhar Zaman's 60, inflicted a 52 run loss on them. Sarfaraz Ahmed led from the front in game eighteen, he scored an unbeaten half century to steer Quetta to a 5 wicket win over Islamabad. Hazratullah Zazai scored 52 in game nineteen to help Peshawar to a 55 run win over Karachi. On the same day, Kamran Ghulam scored 55 to help Lahore to an 8 wicket win over Quetta. Karachi Kings were eliminated as a result of game twenty one. Waqas Maqsood took 2 wickets in the final over and ran out Chris Jordan to give Islamabad United a 1 run win. Will Smeed was out on 99 in game twenty two, as Peshawar beat Quetta by 24 runs. The next day, Mohammad Rizwan scored 76 to give Multan a 7 wicket win and hand Karachi their eighth consecutive loss.

Week 4 
Mohammad Haris scored his first PSL half century in game twenty four, helping Peshawar to a 10 run win over Islamabad. Multan scored the highest total of the tournament in game twenty five, resulting in a 117 run win over Quetta. As a result, both Peshawar and Lahore qualified for the play-offs. The Karachi–Lahore derby brought a change in fortunes for the kings. They beat the Qalandars by 22 runs to get their only win of the season, on their ninth attempt. Harry Brook's century helped Lahore beat Islamabad by 66 runs in game twenty seven. Despite beating Karachi by 23 runs, Quetta were pretty much out of the PSL in game twenty eight. They would now require Islamabad to lose by 156 runs in their final game. Islamabad did lose their final game to Multan. However their 6 wicket loss was enough to send them to the playoffs at Quetta's expense. Shaheen Shah Afridi's cameo of 39 with the bat sent the final game of the league stage to a super over against Peshawar. His opposing captain Wahab Riaz bowled an economical super over though, conceding 5 runs to help Peshawar Zalmi finish the league stage off with a win.

Playoffs

Qualifier 

The qualifier meant the top two teams on the table, Multan and Lahore, would face off. Lahore won the toss and chose to field. Shan Masood fell cheaply for Multan, however his opening partner Mohammad Rizwan scored an unbeaten 53. Rizwan was supported at the other and by Aamer Azmat, who scored 33, and Rilee Rossouw who finished his innings on 65. Mohammad Hafeez was the pick of the bowlers for Lahore with 1/16 from his four overs. In Lahore's innings the only batsman to really get going was Fakhar Zaman with his 63, as no other batsman got past 30 due to good bowling from Multan, namely Shahnawaz Dahani with 3/19 from his four overs. As a result, the Sultans' won by 28 runs sending them into their second consecutive final and Lahore into Eliminator 2.

Eliminators

Eliminator 1 

The first Eliminator meant the teams at three and four on the table, Peshawar and Islamabad, would play each other. The toss was won by Peshawar who chose to bat. Kamran Akmal scored his first half century of the season for Zalmi, while Mohammad Haris was dismissed for 12. Yasir Khan was next in and was dismissed quickly bringing Shoaib Malik to the crease, Malik continued his good form and scored his third half century of the tournament before getting out. Hasan Ali was the pick of the bowlers for Islamabad with 3/30 from his four overs. In response for United, Alex Hales, scored 62 off 49 to anchor Islamabad's chase. He was supported by the Islamabad middle order who chipped away at Peshawar's score. In the last over, Liam Dawson hit two consecutive boundaries off Benny Howell to seal a 5 wicket win for Islamabad. For Peshawar, the pick of the bowlers was Salman Irshad, who took 3/31 from his 4 overs.  The result meant Islamabad were through to the second Eliminator, where they would face Lahore, and Peshawar were out.

Eliminator 2 

The second eliminator meant the winner of the first Eliminator would face the loser of the Qualifier—Islamabad and Multan respectively. The toss was won by Lahore who chose to bat. Abdullah Shafique stabilised Lahore's innings, after the early wickets of their openers, and he finished on 52. Shafique was supported by contributions from Kamran Ghulam, Mohammad Hafeez and David Wiese which allowed Lahore to finish on 168/7. Liam Dawson had the best bowling figures in the match for Islamabad with his 2/24. In response for United, despite losing wickets often in their chase, Alex Hales's 38 and Azam Khan's 40 got them close to the target. However 2 wickets in the final over meant Islamabad fell short by 6 runs. The pick of the bowlers for Lahore was Haris Rauf, who had figures of 2/31. This result meant that Islamabad were eliminated from the tournament and Lahore were through to the final.

Final

Awards and statistics 
At the end of the season, the player with most runs will be awarded with a Green cap and the Hanif Mohammad Award, and the player with most wickets will be awarded with Maroon cap and the Fazal Mahmood Award.

Most runs

Most wickets

Notes

References

External links 
 
 Series home at ESPNcricinfo

 
2022 in Pakistani cricket